This is a list of seasons played by RCD Espanyol Femenino, the women's section of Spanish football club RCD Espanyol.

Summary

League squad stats by season

2010s

Results by season

2013–14

Pre-season

Primera División

2014–15

Primera División

Copa de la Reina

2015–16

Preseason

Primera División

2016–17

Pre-season

Primera División

2017–18

Pre-season

Primera División

Notes

Femenino
seasons women
Espanyol Femenino
Espanyol
Femenino seasons